The National Institute on Aging (NIA) is a division of the U.S. National Institutes of Health (NIH), located in Bethesda, Maryland. The NIA itself is headquartered in Baltimore, Maryland.

The NIA leads a broad scientific effort to understand the nature of aging and to extend the healthy, active years of life. In 1974, under Public Law 93-296, Congress granted authority to form NIA to provide leadership in aging research, training, health information dissemination, and other programs relevant to aging and older people. In January 2011, President Obama signed into law the National Alzheimer’s Project Act, designating the NIA as the primary federal agency on Alzheimer's disease research.

NIA is led by Director, Richard J. Hodes, M.D, and Acting Deputy Director Melinda Kelley, M.D.

Past Directors
Past Directors from 1974 - present

Mission
NIA's mission is to improve the health and well-being of older Americans through research, and specifically to:
Support and conduct high-quality research on:
Aging processes
Age-related diseases
Special problems and needs of the aged
Train and develop highly skilled research scientists from all population groups.
Develop and maintain state-of-the-art resources to accelerate research progress.
Disseminate information and communicate with the public and interested groups on health and research advances and on new directions for research.

Programs
NIA sponsors research on aging through extramural and intramural programs. The extramural program funds research and training at universities, hospitals, medical centers, and other public and private organizations nationwide. The intramural program conducts basic and clinical research in Baltimore, Maryland, and on the NIH campus in Bethesda, Maryland.

See also
American Federation for Aging Research
Geroscience
Life extension

Notes and references

External links
 NIA homepage
 NIA account on USAspending.gov
 The University of Southern California Davis School of Gerontology

Aging
Organizations established in 1974
Gerontology organizations
Medical research institutes in Maryland